The 2009 African Fencing Championships were held in Dakar, Senegal from 6 to 9 August.

Medal summary

Men's events

Women's events

Medal table
 Host

References

2014
African Fencing Championships
International fencing competitions hosted by Egypt
2014 in Egyptian sport